AT&T Teleholdings, Inc., formerly known as Ameritech Corporation (and before that American Information Technologies Corporation), is an American telecommunications company that arose out of the 1984 AT&T divestiture. Ameritech was one of the seven Regional Bell Operating Companies that was created following the breakup of the Bell System. Ameritech was acquired in 1999 by SBC Communications, which subsequently acquired AT&T Corporation in 2006, becoming the present-day AT&T.

Overview
Ameritech was created as a holding company that owned five former Bell System companies in the Midwest. Under its umbrella were:
 Illinois Bell Telephone Company
 Indiana Bell Telephone Company, Inc.
 Michigan Bell Telephone Company
 Ohio Bell Telephone Company
 Wisconsin Bell, Inc.

For Ameritech's first nine years, it maintained these Bell brands inherited from the Bell System—though public displays of the Bell companies' names were often captioned "An Ameritech Company". In January 1993, Ameritech officially retired the Bell brands and marketed itself with solely the Ameritech name across all five states in its territory. It added "d/b/a Ameritech (state)" to the names of its Bells to communicate brand unity.

Ameritech also owned Ameritech Cellular, a wireless company that operated cellular networks in many of the major cities of these states. Ameritech Cellular was previously called Ameritech Mobile Communications. Ameritech also provided cable television service in select areas as part of the Americast venture with other phone companies during the 1990s.

Ameritech Advanced Data Services (AADS) Network Access Point (NAP) was one of the original four National Science Foundation exchange points in the United States starting in 1994. AADS was a Tier 1 network Internet Exchange Point in Chicago, Illinois that provided service to higher education and research networks via a program called Star TAP and commercial networks. After the merger with SBC, AADS did business as the SBC Network Access Point or SBC/AADS NAP.

Prior to its merger with SBC Communications, Ameritech's corporate headquarters were in a leased space above the Chicago Mercantile Exchange on floors 34 through 39 of 30 S Wacker Dr, Chicago. Further corporate offices were located at 225 W Randolph St, Chicago (formerly "The Illinois Bell Building") and 2000 W. Ameritech Center Drive, Hoffman Estates) ("The Ameritech Center"). It was traded on the NYSE under the "AIT" symbol.

Merger with SBC Communications 

In May 1998, Ameritech announced its intent to merge with SBC Communications. This brought great concern to Federal and state regulators, who in turn didn't approve the merger until SBC and Ameritech agreed to several conditions to ensure adequate competition. Most notably, regulators required:

 that the merged company offer local phone service in thirty markets outside of its home territory within thirty months of the merger (i.e. by April 2002) or pay a $1.18B penalty
 and that Ameritech Cellular assets in Chicago be sold to GTE. Since SBC already had a majority stake in a large mobile provider (Cellular One), the merged company, if it were to operate Ameritech Cellular and Cellular One both in the same market, would have wielded too much market power.

SBC and Ameritech officially merged on October 8, 1999. Prior to the merger, Ameritech's Chairman and CEO was Richard Notebaert, who later (in 2002) became CEO of competitor Qwest.

The end of the Ameritech name 
On January 15, 2003, SBC Communications changed its d.b.a. names, changed the legal name of Ameritech Corp. to SBC Teleholdings, Inc., which began doing business as SBC Midwest. On January 15, 2006, d.b.a names were again changed to align with SBC's assumption of the AT&T brand identity following its acquisition of AT&T Corp. the previous year, and Ameritech was again renamed, becoming AT&T Teleholdings, Inc. and began doing business as AT&T Midwest.

Several Ameritech subsidiaries remain legally named "Ameritech", such as Ameritech Advanced Services; however, they do business as "AT&T Advanced Solutions".

In 2006, the holding companies Pacific Telesis and Southern New England Telecommunications were legally merged into AT&T Teleholdings. The company then became a holding company for Pacific Bell (and its subsidiary Nevada Bell) and Southern New England Telephone.

In popular culture

The Ameritech name was used in the storyline of the U.S. television miniseries Amerika to refer to one of the "sovereign" autonomous regions—Ameritech's regional operating area, the Great Lakes area of North America—that the former United States was divided into in result of the fictional Soviet occupation that is the base premise of the miniseries' plot.

See also
 Ameritech Library Services (Dynix)

References

External links 
 Bell System Memorial's RBOC page
 Archive of Ameritech Intercept Messages
 FCC APPROVES SBC-AMERITECH MERGER SUBJECT TO COMPETITION-ENHANCING CONDITIONS (FCC decree allowing merger)
 RBOCs (Regional Bell Operating Company)

Bell System
AT&T subsidiaries
History of Chicago
Companies based in Chicago
1983 establishments in Illinois
Defunct telecommunications companies of the United States
Telecommunications companies established in 1983
American companies established in 1983
1999 mergers and acquisitions